The 1929 Paris–Roubaix was the 30th edition of the Paris–Roubaix, a classic one-day cycle race in France. The single day event was held on 31 March 1929 and stretched  from Paris to its end in a velodrome in Roubaix. The winner was Charles Meunier from Belgium.

Results

References

Paris–Roubaix
Paris–Roubaix
Paris–Roubaix
Paris–Roubaix